Westminster is an unincorporated community in western Auglaize Township, Allen County, Ohio, United States. The upper reaches of the Auglaize River flow past the community.

Westminster is part of the Lima Metropolitan Statistical Area.

Westminster is the home of Rudolph Foods, a large producer of pork rinds.

History
Westminster was platted in 1834. A post office called Westminster was established in 1837, and remained in operation until 1944.

References

Unincorporated communities in Allen County, Ohio
Unincorporated communities in Ohio
1834 establishments in Ohio
Populated places established in 1834